The New Orleans and Gulf Coast Railway Company (NOGC) is a short-line railroad headquartered in Belle Chasse, Louisiana. It is a subsidiary of the Rio Grande Pacific Company and operates two former Union Pacific Railroad (UP) branch lines located outside New Orleans, Louisiana. The company operates  of track and interchanges with the UP in Westwego.

References

External links
HawkinsRails' New Orleans & Gulf Coast page

Louisiana railroads
Switching and terminal railroads